Marvin "Smitty" Smith (born June 24, 1961) is an American jazz drummer and composer.

Marvin Smith was born in Waukegan, Illinois, where his father, Marvin Sr., was a drummer. "Smitty" was exposed to music at a young age, receiving formal musical training at the age of three. 

After graduating from Waukegan East High School, Smith attended Berklee, graduating in 1981. Smith has recorded 200 albums with various artists, as well as two solo albums. He has toured with, among others, Sting, Dave Holland, Sonny Rollins, Willie Nelson and Steve Coleman.  He is a former member of The New York Jazz Quartet, and was the drummer for the Tonight Show with Jay Leno band, led by Kevin Eubanks, from January 30, 1995 until the show's end on May 29, 2009. Smith was also the drummer for the Jay Leno Show band in 2009-10.

Discography

As leader
Keeper of the Drums (Concord Jazz, 1987)
The Road Less Traveled (Concord Jazz, 1989)

As sideman
With Michel Camilo (One More Once , 1994)

 Dreamlight
 On the Other Hand
 Not Yet

With Terence Blanchard and Donald Harrison
New York Second Line (The George Wein Collection)
With Hamiet BluiettEbu (Soul Note, 1984)
With Joanne BrackeenTurnaround (Evidence, 1992)
With Igor Butman
 Falling Out (Impromptu, 1993)
With Donald ByrdHarlem Blues (Landmark, 1987)
With Don ByronNo-vibe Zone (Knitting Factory Works, 1996)
With Steve Coleman and M-Base
Steve Coleman Group: Motherland Pulse (JMT, 1985)
Five Elements – On the Edge of Tomorrow (JMT, 1986)
Five Elements – Sine Die (Pangaea, 1987)
Strata Institute (Double Trio with Greg Osby): Cipher Syntax (JMT, 1989)
Five Elements – Rhythm People (Novus/BMG, 1990)
Strata Institute: Transmigration (Rebel-X/Columbia, 1991)
Five Elements – Black Science (Novus, 1991)Rhythm in Mind (Novus, 1991)
M-Base Collective: Anatomy of a Groove (Rebel-X/DIW/Columbia, 1992)
Five Elements – Drop Kick (Novus, 1992)
With Larry CoryellShining Hour (Muse, 1989)
With Ray DrummondExcursion (Arabesque, 1993)Continuum (Arabesque, 1994)
With Robin EubanksKarma (JMT, 1991)Mental Images (JMT, 1994)
With Art FarmerSomething to Live For: The Music of Billy Strayhorn (Contemporary, 1987)Ph.D. (Contemporary, 1989)
With Frank Foster and Frank WessTwo for the Blues (Pablo, 1984) Frankly Speaking (Concord, 1985)
With Benny GolsonStardust (Denon, 1987) with Freddie HubbardThat's Funky (Meldac Jazz, 1995) with Nat Adderley
With Gunter Hampel New York OrchestraFresh Heat – Live at Sweet Basil (Birth, 1985) with Bill Frisell, Curtis Fowlkes, Bob Stewart, a.o.
With John Hicks
 Beyond Expectations (Reservoir, 1993)
With Dave HollandSeeds of Time (ECM, 1983)The Razor's Edge (ECM, 1987)Extensions (ECM, 1990)
With Andy JaffeManhattan Projections (Stash, 1985) with Wallace Roney and Branford Marsalis
With the Art Farmer/Benny Golson JazztetBack to the City (Contemporary, 1986)Real Time (Contemporary, 1986)
With Carmen LundyJazz & the New Songbook: Live at the Madrid (CD and DVD, Afrasia, 2005)
With Buddy MontgomeryTies of Love (Landmark, 1987)
With Ralph MooreRejuvenate! (Criss Cross, 1988)
With David MurrayChildren (Black Saint, 1984)
With David "Fathead" NewmanFire! Live at the Village Vanguard (Atlantic, 1989)Blue Head (Candid, 1990) with Clifford Jordan
With Joe Newman and Joe WilderHangin' Out (Concord Jazz, 1984)
With Emily RemlerEast To Wes (Concord, 1988)
With Sonny RollinsSonny Rollins Plays G-Man and Other Music for the Soundtrack of the Robert Mugge Film "Saxophone Colossus" (Milestone, 1987)
With Michel Sardaby Going Places (Sound Hills, 1989)
With Archie SheppSoul Song (Enja, 1982)Down Home New York (Soul Note, 1984)
With SuperblueSuperblue 2 (Blue Note, 1989)
With Harvie Swartz, Mick Goodrick, and John AbercrombieArrival (Novus, 1992)
With McCoy TynerPrelude and Sonata (Milestone, 1995)
With Gebhard Ullmann, Andreas Willers, and Bob StewartSuite Noire (Nabel, 1990)
With Bobby WatsonLove Remains'' (Red, 1986 [1988])

References

African-American drummers
American jazz drummers
American people of Liberian descent
African-American television personalities
Berklee College of Music alumni
Living people
1961 births
20th-century American drummers
American male drummers
20th-century American male musicians
American male jazz musicians
The Tonight Show Band members
The Jazztet members
Superblue (band) members
20th-century African-American musicians
21st-century African-American people